Eupithecia albidulata is a moth in the  family Geometridae. It is found in the Caucasus.

References

Moths described in 1892
albidulata
Moths of Asia
Moths of Europe